In accordance with the (16 May 2007) the United Nations General Assembly proclamation of the International Year of Languages in 2008, the Arabic Language International Council was established by the Arab universities association. The organization was formed within the framework of the UN's effort to promote Unity in diversity, and also in recognition of the UN's push for multilingualism as a means of promoting, protecting and preserving the diversity of languages and cultures globally, particularly in the paramount importance attributed to the quality of the organization's six official languages (Arabic, Chinese, English, French, Russian, and Spanish).

The founding of Arabic Language International Council was participated in by more than 160 university rectors and presidents in a series of 41 conferences which took place in Riyadh in 14–16 April 2008.

At the same time, the council is supported and encouraged by the ministers of education in most of the Arab countries, the Secretary Generals of the Arab League, Organisation of the Islamic Conference, Muslim World League, the Arab Gulf States Cooperation Council, the Arab Maghreb Union, and the Arab Economic Unity Council. This is in addition to the support and approval of the General Directors of UNESCO, ISESCO, ALECSO, and the Arab Bureau of Education for the Gulf States. Also, strong support came from universities rectors, presidents and the secretary generals of the Arab college's associations in Arab universities including colleges and institutes of education, colleges of science, colleges of law, colleges of pharmacy, colleges of engineering, colleges of computing and information, colleges of art, colleges of medicine, colleges of dentists medicine, colleges of science and information technology, colleges of administration sciences.

Initiatives 
Since its founding, the council has been very active in promoting the Arabic language. Together with UNESCO, it holds the annual International Conference for the Arabic Language, which draws experts, academics, students, policymakers, and bureaucrats. On its second year, which focused on the discussion of the survival of the Arabic language, the forum already drew thousands of participants as well as high level regional and international sponsorship. This event also serves as an opportunity to forge partnerships such as the case of a memorandum of agreement signed by the council and the ISESCO, which outlined specific measures to effectively teach the Arabic language and highlight its role in preserving the Islamic identity.

See also
Arabic
Modern Standard Arabic
Arab League
Arab world
List of countries where Arabic is an official language

References

External links
 Arabic Language International Council

Arabic language
Arabic language regulators
 Educational institutions established in 2008